Tum Haseen Main Jawan is a 1970 Hindi movie directed by Bhappi Sonie. The film stars Dharmendra, Hema Malini, Pran, Helen and Rajindernath. The film was remade in Kannada as Tuvvi Tuvvi Tuvvi in 1999.

Plot
Raja Sahib dies leaving a will that proclaims that his grandchild will inherit all his wealth. The will also proclaims that the grandchild and the mother need to claim this by a certain date, failing so will transfer the wealth to Ranjeet (Pran), his nephew. In order to secure all the wealth, Ranjeet decides to kill the grandchild. To protect her sister’s son from Ranjeet, Anuradha (Hema Malini) hides the child, who through various circumstances ends up with Sunil (Dharmendra) a Navy officer who brings the child home and looks after him. To provide for the child, Sunil gives an advertisement for a nanny. Anuradha takes up the job to protect the child. Sunil and Anuradha fall in love with each other in the meanwhile. Unfortunately their plan to marry is thwarted by Ranjeet. Ranjeet later kidnaps the child and tries to kill him. Sunil is able to stop Ranjeet and rescue the child and return it to the mother.

Cast
Dharmendra... Sunil
Hema Malini... Anuradha
Pran... Ranjeet
Rajendra Nath... Romeo
Helen... Jina (Ranjeet's wife)
Dhumal... Seth Ganpat Rao
Sulochana Latkar... Sunil's mother
Mohan Choti... Bansidhar
Anwar Hussain... Captain Shamsher
Anjali Kadam... Gayatri Devi
Iftekhar... Raja Sahab (Anuradha's dad)
Brahm Bhardwaj... Naval Doctor
Brahmachari... Naval Officer
Krishan Dhawan... Barrister Avinash
Abhimanyu Sharma... Doctor Sharma
C. S. Dubey... Zorawar Singh
Gulshan... Shantaram - Driver (uncredited)
Moolchand... Balding guy in black suit (uncredited)

Soundtrack

External links 
 

1970 films
1970s Hindi-language films
Films scored by Shankar–Jaikishan
Cross-dressing in Indian films
Indian Navy in films
Films about child abduction in India
Films directed by Bhappi Sonie
Hindi films remade in other languages